Rokeby, also known as La Bergerie, is a historic estate and federally recognized historic district located at Barrytown in Dutchess County, New York, United States. It includes seven contributing buildings and one contributing structure.

History
The original section of the main house was built 1811–1815. Construction was interrupted by the War of 1812 when John Armstrong Jr. (1758-1843), the owner, served as a Brigadier General, Minister to France, and later as US Secretary of War under James Madison. When the British burned Washington DC in 1814, Armstrong received much of the blame, as he had previously insisted that the British would not attack Washington and failed to properly provide for the defense of the city; he consequently retired to finish building his estate on the Hudson River in 1815. The Armstrongs originally called their home "La Bergerie," French for "the sheepfold," as they were raising a large herd of Merino sheep which had been a gift from Napoleon Bonaparte.

In 1818, Armstrong's daughter, Margaret Rebecca, married William Backhouse Astor, Sr. (1795–1875), son and main heir of John Jacob Astor. In 1836, William Astor purchased the 728-acre estate from his father-in-law for $50,000. The portion of the property containing the Mudder Kill is said to have reminded Margaret Astor of the glen in Sir Walter Scott's epic poem, Rokeby, and she changed the estate's name from "La Bergerie" to "Rokeby."

Description
Evidence suggests that the overall plan was designed by John Armstrong himself. It started as a rectangular, 2-story structure with a hipped roof topped by a square, pyramidal-roofed cupola. The house had a three-bay front facade with five-bay side elevations. There is a central entrance and interior hall which opens into three rooms on each side, and a curved staircase was located at the back of this hall. The staircase returned and entered a rectangular hall with a large skylight (known as a clerestory) on the second floor. The four front bedrooms were accessed from this hall. There was originally a second straight staircase that led from grade to an elaborate door with sidelights on the second floor which was open to the main hall. Due to later alterations, this feature is now completely enclosed. On the other side of the door there is now a small vestibule, an arched passage, and a small flight of stairs descending to the main staircase. It features a Palladian window on the southeast face of the second story. A -story addition constructed of fieldstone was built about 1816.

In the mid-19th century William Backhouse Astor enlarged the house from 20 rooms to 48, in brick with brownstone trim, with a semi-octagonal tower on the west side, a north wing, and a third floor throughout the building. The service wing, tower and mansard roof date to 1857–1858. The spectacular gothic revival library contained within the tower is probably the work of Alexander Jackson Davis. Architect and Chanler family friend Stanford White was hired to enlarge the west drawing room and to install the clerestory in 1895. A sun porch was added in the 1920s. 

The landscaping was improved about 1846 by Hans Jacob Ehlers, who removed a nearby hill to permit a view of the Hudson River. In 1911 the Olmsted Brothers enlarged the flower gardens and planted an apple orchard. The property also includes a pair of clapboarded wood-frame barns, additional stables (built about 1850 and destroyed by fire), greenhouse (converted to a garage in 1910, then to a residence in 1965), the square brick gardener's cottage, and a -story gatehouse. Additionally, there is a brick stable designed by McKim, Mead & White, and a private docking facility.

Residents
John Armstrong Jr. lived at Rokeby following his retirement in 1814 until his death at home in 1843, and is buried in the cemetery in Rhinebeck. William and Rebecca Astor's daughter Emily married Samuel Cutler Ward, brother of Julia Ward Howe. Their daughter, Margaret Astor Ward (1838-1875) married John Winthrop Chanler (1826-1877).

The house was later home to the Astor Orphans, the children of John and Margaret, both of whom died of pneumonia. They left instructions that their ten children were to be raised at Rokeby. Most of them grew up to become well known in politics or the arts. John Winthrop Chanler's will provided $20,000 a year for each child for life (equivalent to $470,563 in 2018 dollars), enough to live comfortably by the standards of the time. They included:
John Armstrong "Archie" Chanler (1862-1935), who married and later divorced novelist Amélie Louise Rives
Winthrop Astor Chanler (1863-1926), who served in the Rough Riders in Cuba and was wounded at the Battle of Tayacoba
Emily Astor Chanler (1864-1872), who died of scarlet fever
Elizabeth Astor Winthrop Chanler (1866-1937), who married author John Jay Chapman
William Astor Chanler (1867-1934), soldier, politician and explorer who married actress Minnie Ashley.
Marion Ward Chanler (1868-1883), who died of pneumonia
Lewis Stuyvesant Chanler (1869-1942), politician who married Julia Lynch Olin (1882–1961).
Margaret Livingston Chanler (1870-1963), who served as a nurse with the American Red Cross during the Spanish–American War and who married Richard Aldrich (1863–1937)
Robert Winthrop Chanler (1872-1930), artist who married and later divorced Natalina "Lina" Cavalieri (1874–1944)
Alida Beekman Chanler (1873-1969) who married Christopher Temple Emmet.
 Egerton White Chanler (1874–1882), who died of a brain tumor

As the eldest son, John Armstrong Chanler inherited the property with all its stock, books, pictures, furniture, and personal property, on his twenty-first birthday in 1883, along with $100,000 (equivalent to $2,352,813 in 2018 dollars) for its maintenance, however after his marriage began to disintegrate, he moved to Roanoke Rapids, North Carolina. By agreement of the siblings, Margaret Livingston Chanler bought their shares in the estate during the 1890s. Her grandson Richard Aldrich inherited the estate upon her death in 1963. It is currently owned by the Aldrich family.

In 2013, former resident and Astor heiress Alexandra Aldrich (great-granddaughter of Margaret Livingston Chanler) published The Astor Orphan, a memoir set at Rokeby.

The house is currently the home to various artists and writers, including Processional Arts Workshop. Ragnar Kjartansson's The Visitors (2012), an approximately hour-long video-performance, was filmed on location. It is also the site of the Shoving Leopard organic farm.

Heritage significance
It was added to the National Register of Historic Places in 1975.

Gallery
Photos of La Bergerie by Mark Zeek, 1979.

See also

Hudson River Historic District
National Register of Historic Places listings in Dutchess County, New York
 Poets' Walk Park

References

External links
 Slideshow showing Rokeby and its residents in 2010.
 Aerial views of Rokeby and the estate grounds
 Interior Pictures: La Bergerie/Rokeby Mansion Barrytown New York
 Life Inside Astor Family's Crumbling Country Manor
 Hudson River Shorts: A brief video tour of Rokeby Farm in Barrytown, NY.

Historic districts on the National Register of Historic Places in New York (state)
National Register of Historic Places in Dutchess County, New York
Historic districts in Dutchess County, New York
Houses in Red Hook, New York
Astor family residences
Chanler family